52 sumo wrestlers have reached the second highest in the sport, the rank of ōzeki, but have failed to rise to the top rank since the modern era of sumo began in 1927 with the merger of the Tokyo and Osaka organizations. By 2020, over 250 wrestlers have been promoted to the rank of ōzeki throughout the entire history of the sport. Wrestlers who went on to be promoted to yokozuna are tabulated in the list of yokozuna.

The number of top division yūshō (championships) won by each ōzeki is also listed. There is no requirement to win a championship before promotion, but a wrestler must usually have won around 33 bouts over three consecutive tournaments. Since 1927, the longest-serving ōzeki of modern times have been Kaiō and Chiyotaikai who each held the rank for 65 tournaments. With five wins, Kaiō also holds the record for yūshō won in the modern era by a wrestler to never reach the rank of yokozuna.

List

* Wrestler held the rank on more than one occasion.

See also
List of past sumo wrestlers
List of sumo tournament top division champions
List of yokozuna
List of sekiwake
List of komusubi

Notes

ōzeki
Lists of sumo wrestlers
Ōzeki